Cinco gallinas y el cielo is a 1957 Argentine science-fiction drama film directed by Uruguayan-born filmmaker Ruben W. Cavallotti, written by Agustín Cuzzani and starring Narciso Ibáñez Menta. The film won awards at the international festivals of Karlovy Vary and San Sebastian.

Plot 
A scientist experiments with chicken breeding in order to produce a miraculous meat, capable of changing the lives and tempers of its consumers.

Cast
  Narciso Ibáñez Menta
  Luis Arata
  Irma Córdoba
  Alita Román
  Ricardo Castro Ríos
  Aurelia Ferrer
  Ignacio Quirós
  María Esther Corán
  Alberto Barcel

References

Bibliography

External links
 

1957 films
1950s Spanish-language films
Argentine black-and-white films
Argentine science fiction films
Films directed by Rubén W. Cavallotti
1950s Argentine films